Higginson is a second-class city in White County, Arkansas, United States. Randall Homsley is the current mayor and was a volunteer police officer until the volunteer police force was disbanded.

The population was 621 at the 2010 census.

Geography
Higginson is located at  (35.197323, -91.712319).

Demographics

As of the census of 2000, there were 378 people, 145 households, and 103 families residing in the town. The racial makeup of the town was 97.35% White, 0.26% Native American, 0.26% Asian, and 2.12% from two or more races.  1.85% of the population were Hispanic or Latino of any race.

There were 145 households, out of which 31.0% had children under the age of 18 living with them, 59.3% were married couples living together, 7.6% had a female householder with no husband present, and 28.3% were non-families. 20.0% of all households were made up of individuals, and 4.8% had someone living alone who was 65 years of age or older.  The average household size was 2.61 and the average family size was 3.06.

In the town, the population was spread out, with 25.4% under the age of 18, 11.1% from 18 to 24, 28.8% from 25 to 44, 27.0% from 45 to 64, and 7.7% who were 65 years of age or older.  The median age was 34 years. For every 100 females, there were 95.9 males.  For every 100 females age 18 and over, there were 101.4 males.

The median income for a household in the town was $25,114, and the median income for a family was $29,250. Males had a median income of $26,750 versus $17,344 for females. The per capita income for the town was $11,568.  About 13.7% of families and 18.2% of the population were below the poverty line, including 28.8% of those under age 18 and 20.0% of those age 65 or over.

Climate
The climate in this area is characterized by hot, humid summers and generally mild to cool winters.  According to the Köppen Climate Classification system, Higginson has a humid subtropical climate, abbreviated "Cfa" on climate maps.

Education
It is zoned to Searcy Public Schools, which operates Searcy High School.

References

Cities in White County, Arkansas
Cities in Arkansas